Chunichi may refer to:

 Chunichi Dragons, a professional baseball team based in Nagoya, Japan
 Chunichi Shimbun, a progressive-liberal Japanese newspaper
 Chubu-Nippon Broadcasting, a Japanese radio and television network